The  "Louisiana primary" is the common term for top-two runoff voting system where all candidates for the same office appear together on the ballot in the general election, and if none win a simple majority, a runoff or second round election for the two top candidates is held a short time later to determine the winner. 

The system is used in the Louisiana general election for local, state, and congressional offices. Though strictly speaking it occurs during the general election and so 
is not a primary election, the general election serves as a primary if no candidate in the race wins a majority. On election day, all candidates for the same office appear together on the ballot, often including several candidates from each major party.  If no candidate wins a simple majority in the first round, there is a runoff one month later between the top two candidates to determine the winner. This system is also used for United States Senate special elections in Mississippi and Texas, and all special elections for partisan offices in Georgia. It is also used for municipal elections in Chicago, Illinois.

Comparison with other voting models
The Louisiana primary is similar to the nonpartisan blanket primary (or top two primary) currently used in Washington and California since in both models, all candidates regardless of party identification run against each other in the first round, and (usually) the top two run against each other in a second round. In the top two system there is always a second round even if the leader gets a simple majority.

The timing of the two systems is also different. The first round in the Louisiana primary is held on or near election day in November and the runoff is about a month later, while the top two primary holds the second round on election day in November and holds the first round months earlier. The Louisiana primary is an example of the two-round system.

Example: Louisiana governor's race, 1991

First Ballot, October 19, 1991

Second Ballot, November 16, 1991

Despite Republicans collectively attaining a majority of the support in the 1st ballot, the Democratic candidate Edwards won decisively on the second ballot. Edwin Edwards' win is most likely attributed to the fact that David Duke was a former Grand Wizard of the Ku Klux Klan, and thus was unpalatable to mainstream voters, in spite of allegations of corruption during Edwards' first three terms.  Evidence of this exists in the unofficial campaign slogan "Vote for the Lizard, not the Wizard," a bumper sticker cited by The Wall Street Journal "Vote for the crook, it's important," and Roemer endorsing Edwards prior to the second round. Under this system, party label is self-identifying, which means that David Duke was able to declare himself a Republican candidate without the consent of the Republican Party. Duke's win in the first round may have been tactical voting (Democrats voting for Duke), which has been observed in some two-round electoral systems. Polls had shown that Roemer could have defeated either Edwards or Duke if he had made it to the second round.

Party labels
The runoff sometimes includes two candidates of the same party, a phenomenon which frequently occurs. Historically, the Democratic Party was dominant in Louisiana from the late 19th through much of the 20th century, especially after the state legislature disenfranchised most blacks at the turn of the 20th century, weakening the Republican Party.

The only party labels originally permitted under the Louisiana law were Democratic, Republican, and No Party; however, candidates may take the identity of any "registered political party". The primary has been used in statewide elections since 1975. The system was designed by then-Governor Edwin Edwards after he had to run in two grueling rounds of the Democratic Primary in 1971 before facing a general election against a well-funded and well-rested Republican, Dave Treen. (Treen was elected governor under the new system in 1979, defeating five major Democratic candidates).

Federal elections
The nonpartisan blanket election was never used for presidential primaries in Louisiana because national party rules forbid it. It has been used for congressional elections from 1978 to the present, with a brief interruption in 2008 and 2010.

Starting in 1978, the Louisiana legislature changed the rules for conducting US House and Senate elections, changing them to the nonpartisan blanket primary format, with primaries in late September or early October, and general elections on the federal election day in November. Any candidate who received the required "50 per cent plus one vote" in the primary, or was unopposed in the primary, was declared elected and did not appear on the general election ballot.

The U.S. Supreme Court in Foster v. Love (1997) ruled that this system was in violation of federal law when used for congressional elections, since the federal law requires all members of Congress to be elected on the federal election day; thus, candidates who won in primaries earlier than the federal election day violated this law.

After the decision, Louisiana moved the congressional primary date to November and the run-off to December in order to keep the nonpartisan blanket format. The result was that any candidate who won a congressional race through a general election (run-off) lost seniority to those members elected in November on the national election day. Louisiana's freshmen members were assigned inferior office space because they were junior to members elected in November.

In May 2005, Louisiana passed a law moving the primary back to October, with provisions intended to follow federal law. In June 2006, Louisiana Governor Kathleen Blanco signed Senate Bill No. 18 (later Act No. 560) into law, which took effect in 2008. It returned Congressional races to the closed primary system.

In 2010, the legislature voted to revert federal elections to the nonpartisan blanket primary system with the passage of House Bill 292, which was signed into law by Governor Bobby Jindal on June 25, 2010. Since Louisiana's primary is virtually identical to the Washington state primary system, which was upheld by the US Supreme Court in Washington State Grange v. Washington State Republican Party (2008), it appears to satisfy constitutional concerns.

References

External links
Louisiana Secretary of State's review of election types
Louisiana elections
Electoral systems
Runoff voting
Primary elections in the United States
Elections in the United States